St. Nicholas Park is a public park in Manhattan, New York City, between the neighborhoods of Harlem, Hamilton Heights and Manhattanville. The nearly  park is contained by 141st Street to the north, 128th Street to the south, St. Nicholas Terrace to the west, and St. Nicholas Avenue to the east.

History
The park was created in 1895, when the first land for the park was acquired upon the condemnation of the Croton Aqueduct. After additional property was acquired, construction  on the park began in 1906. Like the streets on its eastern and western borders, the park was named after St. Nicholas, the patron saint of Amsterdam whose likeness adorned one of the ships that brought the first Dutch settlers to New Amsterdam. Parks Commissioner Samuel Parsons designed the park himself. The park next expanded in 1909, when the park's southern boundary was extended to 128th Street. In 1931, a playground opened along 129th Street. A new playground was erected on this site in 1965.

Features

St. Nicholas Park contains Alexander Hamilton's historic home, The Grange. Now designated as the Hamilton Grange National Memorial, it was moved  in 2008 from Convent Avenue to the north side of St. Nicholas Park, facing 141st Street. The Grange was considered a "country home" when it was built in 1802, and its new location is within the boundaries of Hamilton's original  estate.

Much of City College of New York's campus, including Shepard Hall, is just across St. Nicholas Terrace. The wooded park features basketball courts, playgrounds, handball courts, a dog park, and barbecue areas maintained by NYC Parks. Other attractions include large Manhattan schist outcrops, and monarch butterflies that cover the butterfly bushes at migration time.

Transportation
The park can be reached via the New York City Subway's IND Eighth Avenue Line at the 125th Street, 135th Street, or 145th Street stations.

In popular culture
The park is the setting for a scene from the independent film The Mend, starring Josh Lucas.

See also

 List of New York City parks

References
Notes

External links

 Information about St. Nicholas Park at the New York City Department of Parks and Recreation website
 Friends of St. Nicholas Park

Parks in Manhattan
Hamilton Heights, Manhattan
Dog parks in the United States
Protected areas established in 1895
1895 establishments in New York City
Saint Nicholas